Holmskioldia is a genus of flowering plants in the mint family, Lamiaceae. It is native to the Himalayas (India, Pakistan, Nepal, Bhutan, Bangladesh, Myanmar) but widely cultivated as an ornamental and naturalized in many places (Southeast Asia, New Caledonia, Hawaii, Mexico, West Indies, Venezuela, etc.) It contains only one known species, Holmskioldia sanguinea, commonly called the Chinese hat plant, cup-and-saucer-plant or mandarin's hat.

The genus name commemorates Johan Theodor Holmskiold (1731-1793), a Danish botanist who wrote Beata ruris otia fungis Danicis, published in two volumes in 1790 and 1799.

Species formerly included
The following species have been moved to genus Karomia: 
 Holmskioldia gigas Faden = Karomia gigas (Faden) Verdc.
 Holmskioldia speciosa Hutch. & Corbishley = Karomia speciosa (Hutch. & Corbishley) R.Fern. – Southern Chinese hats, wild parasol flower 
 Holmskioldia tettensis (Klotzsch) Vatke = Karomia tettensis (Klotzsch) R.Fern. – Cups-and-saucers, wild parasol flower

The plant contains oroxindin, a type of polyphenolic compound.

Gallery

References

Lamiaceae
Monotypic Lamiaceae genera
Flora of tropical Asia
Garden plants